The United States Air Force Warfare Center (USAFWC) at Nellis Air Force Base, Nevada, reports directly to Air Combat Command. The center was founded on September 1, 1966, as the U.S. Air Force Tactical Fighter Weapons Center. It was renamed the U.S. Air Force Warfare Center in 2005.

Overview
The USAF Warfare Center manages advanced pilot training and integrates many of the Air Force's test and evaluation requirements. It was established in 1966 as the USAF Tactical Fighter Weapons Center which concentrated on the development of forces and weapons systems that were specifically geared to tactical air operations in conventional (non-nuclear) war and contingencies. It continued to perform this mission for nearly thirty years, undergoing several name changes in the 1990s. In 1991, the center became the USAF Fighter Weapons Center, and then the USAF Weapons and Tactics Center in 1992.

The USAF Warfare Center uses the lands and airspace of the Nevada Test and Training Range (NTTR) – which occupies about three million acres (12,000 km2) of land, the largest such range in the United States, and another five-million-acre (20,000 km2) military operating area which is shared with civilian aircraft. The center also uses Eglin AFB, FL, range, which adds even greater depth to the center's capabilities, providing over water and additional electronic expertise to the center.

The USAF Warfare Center oversees operations of the 57th Wing, the NTTR, and the 99th Air Base Wings at Nellis AFB, Nevada; the 53rd Wing at Eglin AFB, Florida (with Geographically Separated Units at Tyndall AFB, Florida and Holloman AFB, New Mexico); and the 505th Command and Control Wing at Hurlburt Field, Florida.

Units
 53d Wing (53 WG)
 The 53d Wing serves as the focal point for the combat air forces in electronic combat, armament and avionics, chemical defense, reconnaissance, command and control, and aircrew training devices.
 57th Wing (57 WG)
 The 57th Wing is responsible for a variety of activities, such as Red Flag, which provides realistic training in a combined air, ground and electronic threat environment for U.S. and allied forces.  It is also the parent unit for both the USAF Weapons School (USAFWS) and the USAF Air Demonstration Squadron, the latter better known as the United States Air Force Thunderbirds.
 Nevada Test and Training Range (NTTR)
 Previously known as the 98th Range Wing (98 RANW), the military organization known as NTTR provides command and control of the actual Nevada Test and Training Range facility located north and northwest of Nellis AFB. The 25th Space Range Squadron (SRS) operates and maintains the Space Test and Training Range and is a subordinate unit the NTTR.
 99th Air Base Wing (99 ABW)
 The 99th Air Base Wing is the host wing at Nellis AFB and manages the day-to-day operations of the base.
 505th Command and Control Wing (505 CCW)
 The 505th CCW is dedicated to improving warfighter readiness through integrated training, tactics, and testing for operational-level command and control of air, space, and cyber power. It hosts the Air Force's only Air Operations Center Formal Training Unit (FTU).

History
By the mid-1960s, USAF aircraft and aircrew losses in the Vietnam War had convinced Tactical Air Command (TAC) of the need to improve technical and operational skills for the widening conflict. TAC established the Tactical Fighter Weapons Center at Nellis Air Force Base, Nevada in 1966 for the expressed purpose of improving fighter operations and tactics. Nellis AFB had been referred to as the "Home of the Fighter Pilot" since the Korean War period of the early 1950s, and had a long history of conducting postgraduate fighter training and operational testing and evaluation of fighter weapons systems. Additionally, the Nellis Range, largest in the free world, readily complemented the new center's mission.

Lineage
 Established as the USAF Tactical Fighter Weapons Center in 1966
 Redesignated: USAF Fighter Weapons Center in 1991
 Redesignated: USAF Weapons and Tactics Center in 1992
 Redesignated: USAF Warfare Center in 2005.

Assignments
 Tactical Air Command, 1966 – 1992
 Air Combat Command, 1992 – present

Units assigned
Operational units assigned to the USAFWC have been:

Wing
 4545th Fighter Warfare Wing, 1966 – 22 August 1969
 57th Fighter Weapons Wing, 22 August 1969 – 1 April 1977
 Redesignated: 57th Tactical Training Wing, 1 April 1977 – 1 March 1980
 Redesignated: 57th Fighter Wing, 1 October 1991 – 15 June 1993
 Redesignated: 57th Wing, June 15, 1993 – present

Groups
 57th Fighter 1 November 1991 – present
 57th Test: 1 November 1991 – 1 October 1996
 4440th Tactical Fighter Training (Red Flag)
 Attached 1 October 1979 – 28 February 1980
 Assigned 1 March 1980 – 1 November 1991
 4443d Tactical Training: 26 January 1990 – 1 November 1991

Squadrons
 64th Fighter Weapons (later, 64th Tactical Fighter Training Aggressor; 64th Aggressor): 15 October 1972 – 5 October 1990.
 65th Fighter Weapons (later, 65th Tactical Fighter Training Aggressor; 65th Aggressor): 15 October 1969 – 7 April 1989.
 66th Fighter Weapons: 15 October 1969 – 30 December 1981
 414th Fighter Weapons: 15 October 1969 – 30 December 1981
 422d Fighter Weapons (later, 422d Test and Evaluation): 15 October 1969 – 1 November 1991
 431st Fighter Weapons (later, 431st Test and Evaluation): 1 October 1980 – 1 November 1991
 433d Fighter Weapons: 1 October 1976 – 30 December 1981
 4460th Helicopter: 1 November 1983 – 1 June 1985
 4477th Test and Evaluation Flight (later, 4477th Test and Evaluation Squadron): 1 April 1977 – 15 July 1990
 USAF Air Demonstration Squadron: 15 February 1974 – present

Aircraft flown

 A-7 Corsair II, 1969 – 1975
 F-4 Phantom II, 1969 – 1985, 1992 – 2016
 F-4G Wild Weasel, 1992 – 1995
 QF-4 and QRF-4 Phantom II (Drone), 1993 – 2016 
 F-100 Super Sabre, 1969 – 1972
 QF-100 Super Sabre (Drone), 1983 – 1993
 F-105 Thunderchief, 1969 – 1975
 QF-106 Delta Dart (Drone), 1991–1996
 General Dynamics F-111, 1969 – 1995
 T-38 Talon, 1972 – 1990
 Northrop F-5, 1975 – 1989
 UH-1 Iroquois, 1981 – 1985
 B-1 Lancer, 1993 – 1999
 B-52 Stratofortress, 1993 – 1999
 MQ-1 Predator, 1995 – 2018

 F-22 Raptor, 2004 – present
 F-35 Lightning II, 2014 – present
 F-15 Eagle, 1976 – present
 F-15E Strike Eagle, 1992 – present
 A-10 Thunderbolt II, 1977 – present
 F-16 Fighting Falcon, 1980 – present
 MQ-9 Reaper, 2007 – present

source

List of commanders

References

Military units and formations in Nevada
Centers of the United States Air Force
Clark County, Nevada
Military units and formations established in 1966
1966 establishments in Nevada